Kévin Afougou Jouanneau (born 26 January 1990) is a French professional footballer who plays as a centre-back for Championnat National 2 club Thonon Evian.

Career
Afougou signed with Boulogne-Billancourt in December 2018. 

Ahead of the 2019–20 season, Afougou joined Thonon Evian.

Honours 
Thonon Evian

 Championnat National 3: 2021–22
 Régional 1 Auvergne-Rhône-Alpes: 2019–20

Notes

References

External links
 Kévin Afougou profile at foot-national.com
 
 
 

1990 births
Living people
Footballers from Yvelines
French footballers
Association football defenders
Paris Saint-Germain F.C. players
Paris FC players
LB Châteauroux players
US Orléans players
Stade Lavallois players
AC Boulogne-Billancourt players
Thonon Evian Grand Genève F.C. players
Ligue 2 players
Championnat National players
Championnat National 2 players
Championnat National 3 players
Régional 1 players